is a 1957 Japanese film directed by Shin Saburi and produced by Eizaburô Adachi. The music was composed by Koji Taku.

Cast
 Michiyo Aratama
 Jun Tazaki
 Shûji Sano
 Shin Saburi
 Asami Kuji
 Kenji Sahara
 Momoko Kôchi

References

External links
 

1957 films
Japanese black-and-white films
1950s Japanese-language films
1950s Japanese films